Shardha Ram Phillauri (September 1837 – 24 June 1881) was an Indian writer, poet and social reformer who is remembered for his contributions to Hindi and Punjabi literature. He is best known for his Hindu religious hymn Om Jai Jagdish Hare and Bhagyawati, one of the first novels in Hindi. Phillauri has also been called the "father of modern Punjabi prose." Born in Phillaur, he visited cities across Punjab and died in Lahore in 1881.

Biography
Shardha Ram was born in 1837 to a Brahmin family in the town of Phillaur in the Sikh Empire under the reign of Ranjit Singh. His father, Jai Dyalu, was an astrologer. Their gotra was Moudgil. He did not have any formal education as such. By age ten, he had studied Hindi, Sanskrit, Persian, astrology, and music. Later, he was also a missionary of traditional Hinduism (Sanatana dharma).

In his books, Shardha Ram documented Punjabi culture and language.

Shardha Ram gave forceful lectures on the Mahabharata, and because of this was charged with conducting propaganda against the British government in 1865. As a result, he was exiled temporarily from his home town, Phillaur.

Sharda Ram often visited Amritsar and adjoining Lahore, especially in connection with astrology. During this time, he earned a reputation as an astrologer and wrote several books in Hindi.

In 1886 Sikhan De Raj Di Vithia (Punjabi:The Story of Sikh Rule)  he published,  an account of Sikh religion and the rule of Maharaja Ranjit Singh. The last of its three chapters documents Punjabi culture and language, including its customs, usages, and folk songs. The book was often prescribed as a text book.

Shardha Ram has recently been acknowledged as having written the first novel in Hindi. His novel Bhagyawati, believed to have been written mainly in Amritsar, was first published in 1888, after Shardha Ram's death. The novel's portrayal of women and women's rights was progressive for its day.

Sharda Ram has written the famous and widely sung aarti "Om Jai Jagdish Hare."

Shardha Ram died on 24 June 1881 at Lahore.

Works

Notes and references

Further reading
 Singh Bedi, Harmohinder. Shardha Ram Granthawali.  Nirmal Publisher.  (A three-volume work by the dean and head of the Guru Nanak Dev University Hindi Department.)

External links
Painting of Shardha Ram Phillauri.

1837 births
1881 deaths
Indian male novelists
Hindu poets
Indian Hindu missionaries
Punjabi-language writers
Punjabi people
Indian social reformers
19th-century Indian poets
19th-century Indian novelists
Indian male poets
19th-century Indian male writers
Poets from Punjab, India
Novelists from Punjab, India
People from Punjab Province (British India)